A news desert refers to a community that is no longer covered by daily or nondaily newspapers. The term emerged in the United States after hundreds of daily and weekly newspapers were closed in the 2000s and the 2010s. According to a study in 2018 by the UNC School of Media and Journalism, more than 1,300 communities in the U.S. are considered news deserts. Other communities, while not technically a news desert, may be covered by a ghost newspaper, a publication that has become a shadow of its former self.

Background
The total number of newspapers in the U.S. fell from 8,891 in 2004 to 7,112 in 2018, a decline of 1,779 newspapers, including more than 60 daily newspapers. Of the remaining publications, an estimated 1,000 to 1,500 newspapers were considered ghost newspapers after scaling back their news coverage so much that they were unable to fully cover their communities.

Extent
In 2017, the Columbia Journalism Review released a map of news deserts across the United States. It showed that Collin County and Williamson County in Texas, with a combined population of nearly 1.3 million people, were among the largest news deserts in the country. Other notable news deserts include Ellis County, Texas and Alamance County, North Carolina. Some of those communities, however, may be covered by very small newspapers with a circulation of less than 1% or all-digital news outlets. 

A study in 2018 by the UNC School of Media and Journalism found more than 1,300 news deserts in the United States. Of the 3,143 counties in the U.S., more than 2,000 no longer had a daily newspaper and 171 counties, with 3.2 million residents combined, had no newspaper at all. People who live in news deserts tend to be poorer, older and less educated than the average American, according to the study. As of 2018, more than 90 counties without a newspaper were in the Southern United States, making it by far the largest news desert in the country.

See also

 Decline of newspapers

References

History of newspapers
Journalism